Isgandar Majid oglu Hamidov (also transliterated as Iskender Majid oglu Hamidov or Iskander Medjid oglu Hamidov; April 10, 1948 in Bağlıpəyə village, Kalbajar rayon – February 26, 2020 in Baku) was an Azerbaijani politician, Minister of Internal Affairs of Azerbaijan who served in the Popular Front government of 1992–1993.

As a chairman of Azerbaijan National Democrat Party, informally known as the Grey Wolves, Hamidov pleaded for the creation of a unified Turkic country which would include northern Iran and extend itself to Siberia, India and China. He was known to have threatened Armenia with a nuclear strike.

Isgandar Hamidov resigned in April 1993.  In 1995, he was arrested and sentenced to 14 years in prison for embezzlement of state funds  but was essentially treated as a political prisoner by the Amnesty International and the Council of Europe. He was pardoned by the decree of President Ilham Aliyev in 2004.

References

1948 births
2020 deaths
Nagorno-Karabakh
Recipients of Azerbaijani presidential pardons
Azerbaijani Popular Front Party politicians
Government ministers of Azerbaijan
Azerbaijani people of the Nagorno-Karabakh War
Pan-Turkists
Azerbaijani prisoners and detainees
Prisoners and detainees of Azerbaijan